Bjørgo is a Norwegian surname. Notable people with the surname include:

Narve Bjørgo (born 1936), Norwegian historian
Tore Bjørgo (born 1958), Norwegian criminologist
Trygve Bjørgo, Norwegian educator and lyricist

Norwegian-language surnames